Cheryl Pollak (born August 31, 1967) is an American actress, director and producer.

Biography
Pollak was born in Scottsdale, Arizona and grew up in Greenville, Texas. She graduated from Eisenhower High School in 1985.

She got her start in the entertainment business starring in a series of Jordache jeans commercials. She made her film debut in My Best Friend Is a Vampire. She was a series regular on the television series Hull High, The Heights, Hotel Malibu, and Live Shot.

Personal life
Pollak has been married to actor Richard Murphy since 1999.

Partial filmography
Live Shot (TV Series)...Nancy Lockridge (1995)
Melrose Place (TV Series)...Susan Madsen (1994)
Hotel Malibu (TV Series)...Stephane "Stevie" Mayfield (1994)
Crossing the Bridge...Carol Brockton (1992)
The Heights... Rita MacDougal (1992)
Quantum Leap... Katie McBain (1991)
The Marla Hanson Story a.k.a. Face Value... Marla Hanson (1991)
The Hidden Room (1991)
Hull High (TV series)...Camilla (1990)
Pump Up the Volume...Paige Woodward (1990)
Alien Nation...Kirby Sikes (1989)
Night Life...Charly (1989)
The Dark Side of the Sun...Frances (1988)
21 Jump Street...Diana (1988)
My Best Friend Is a Vampire...Darla Blake (1987)

References

External links

1967 births
Living people
American film actresses
20th-century American actresses
21st-century American actresses
American television actresses
Actresses from Scottsdale, Arizona
American women film producers
Film producers from Arizona